Neokastra ("new fortresses", formally θέμα Νεοκάστρων; in Latin sources Neocastri or Neochastron) was a Byzantine province (theme) of the 12th–13th centuries in north-western Asia Minor (modern Turkey).

Its origin and extent are obscure. According to Niketas Choniates, the theme was founded by Manuel I Komnenos (r. 1143–1180) between 1162 and 1173. Manuel I scoured the region around three cities—Chliara (mod. Kırkağaç), Pergamon and Adramyttion—from the Turkish bands that raided it, rebuilt and refortified the cities and established forts in the countryside and made them into a separate province under a governor titled harmostes ("supervisor") by the archaizing Choniates, but whose actual title in all probability must have been doux. The imperial chrysobull of 1198 to the Venetians on the other hand mentions Adramyttion apart from the Neokastra, and the Partitio Romaniae of 1204 mentions the province of Neokastra as being entirely separate from all three cities. The Byzantinist Helene Ahrweiler interpreted the evidence to suggest that Neokastra did indeed originally encompass the three cities, but that in 1198 Adramyttion may have formed a separate district, and that the separation between the cities and the province evidenced in the Partitio was the result of a copyist's error.

The theme survived the destruction of the Byzantine Empire by the Fourth Crusade, and was retained by the Empire of Nicaea, where it constituted, along with the Thracesian Theme to the south, the most important provinces. The boundaries of the Nicaean province were different, however: Adramyttion was lost to the new Latin Empire, and Pergamon was abandoned and fell in ruins. The account of George Akropolites, reflecting the new situation, mentions Neokastra apart from Chliara and Pergamon, and records the village of Kalamos (mod. Gelenbe) as the northernmost point of the theme, at the Nicaean frontier zone with the Latins. On the basis of Akropolites' passage, the scholar Ruth Macrides suggested an alternative reading of Choniates' passage, which would place the original theme of Neokastra immediately to the east of the three cities. Ahrweiler also suggested that the Nicaean-era province of Neokastra extended as far south as Magnesia or Sardis, but this is conjectural. A handful of governors of the theme are known: Manuel Kalampakes ca. 1284, a certain Libadarios, who was involved in the revolt of Alexios Philanthropenos in 1296, and the parakoimomenos Constantine Doukas Nestongos, active in 1303/4, whom Ahrweiler identifies as the theme's last known doux. The region fell shortly thereafter to the Anatolian beyliks of Karasi and Sarukhan.

References

Sources 
 
 
 

States and territories established in the 12th century
Byzantine Anatolia
Themes of the Byzantine Empire